The Nepal Stock Exchange (NEPSE) is the only stock exchange of Nepal.  the market capitalization of the companies listed on NEPSE totaled .

The basic objective of NEPSE is to impart free marketability and liquidity to the government and corporate securities by facilitating transactions in its trading floor through member, market intermediaries, such as broker, market makers etc.  217 companies are listed on the exchange, which includes commercial banks, hydro-power companies, insurance companies, and finance companies among others.  The Exchange has 50 registered brokers

History
NEPSE opened its trading floor on 13 January 1994.

Ownership structure and board
The current paid-up capital of NEPSE is NPR 500,000,000 (approximately US$4.2 million in October 2020). The following table shows the percentage of shareholdings by the respective shareholders on the capital structure:

Indices

The NEPSE Index is the capitalization-weighted index of all stocks on the Nepal Stock Exchange. Reflecting the large market capitalization of many Nepalese banks, the index is said to predominantly reflect the banking sector.

References

External links
 

1993 establishments in Nepal
Buildings and structures in Kathmandu
Stock Exchange
Stock exchanges in Asia